The following lists events that happened during 1865 in South Africa.

Incumbents
 Governor of the Cape of Good Hope and High Commissioner for Southern Africa: Sir Philip Wodehouse.
 Lieutenant-governor of the Colony of Natal:
 John Maclean (until 25 July).
 Sir John Thomas (acting from 26 July to 25 August).
 Sir John Bisset (acting from 26 August).
 State President of the Orange Free State: Jan Brand.
 President of the Executive Council of the South African Republic: Marthinus Wessel Pretorius.

Events
July
 26 – Sir John Thomas becomes acting Lieutenant-governor of the Colony of Natal.

August
 26 – Sir John Bisset becomes acting Lieutenant-governor of the Colony of Natal.

Date unknown
 Ostriches are domesticated.
 Economic depression hits South Africa.
 War breaks out for the second time between the Orange Free State and Basothos.

Births
 12 January – Jan F. E. Celliers, poet, writer and dramatist. (d. 1940)
 20 August – Bernard Tancred, cricketer. (d. 1911)

Deaths

 13 August – Willem Cornelis Janse van Rensburg, second President of the Executive Council of the South African Republic. (b. 1818)
 Date unknown – Louw Wepener, military leader in the Orange Free State. (b. 1812)

Railways

Locomotives
 The Natal Railway Company obtains a  saddle-tank locomotive from Kitson and Company. The Natal Railway's second locomotive is named Durban.

References

South Africa
Years in South Africa
History of South Africa